Orthosias in Phoenicia was a town in the Roman province of Phoenicia Prima, and a bishopric that was a suffragan of Tyre.

History and geography

The city is mentioned for the first time in 1 Maccabees, 15:37, as a Phœnician port;
Pliny places it between Tripoli, on the south, and the River Eleutherus, on the north; Strabo, near the Eleutherus; Peutinger's "Table", agreeing with Hierocles, George of Cyprus, and others, indicates it between Tripoli and Antaradus.

The discovery on the banks of the Eleutherus of Orthosian coins, dating from Antoninus Pius and bearing figures of Astarte, led to the identification of the site of Orthosias near the River El-Barid at a spot marked by ruins, called Bordj Hakmon el-Yehoudi.

Bishops

Le Quien mentions four bishops, beginning with Phosphorus in the fifth century. Two Latin titulars of the fourteenth century appear in Eubel. In the Notitiae Episcopatuum of Antioch for the 6th century Orthosias is a suffragan of Tyre, while in that of the 10th century (op. cit., X, 97) it is confused with Antaradus or Tortosa.

Notes

References

Attribution
 The entry cites:
Beurlier in Fulcran Vigouroux, Dictionnaire de la Bible, s. v.;
William Smith, Dictionary of Greek and Roman Geography, II, 407.

External links
Catholic Hierarchy page

Catholic titular sees in Asia
Phoenician cities